Renaissance is the debut album by the English progressive rock band Renaissance, released in December 1969.

Track listing
The single version of "Island" (a different recording from the album version, with faster tempo, more overdubbed backing vocals, and no classical themes at the end) was backed with a non-LP B-side, "The Sea."  Some CD editions of the album include both of these tracks.

Personnel

Renaissance
Jane Relf - lead vocals (3,4,6,7), backing vocals, percussion
Keith Relf - guitar, harmonica, lead vocals (1,2,5), backing vocals
John Hawken - piano, harpsichord
Louis Cennamo - bass 
Jim McCarty - drums, percussion, backing vocals, brief 2nd lead vocal (2)

Production
Paul Samwell-Smith - producer
Andy Johns - engineer

Releases
Renaissance was initially released in the UK in 1969 by Island Records as catalogue ILPS-9114; it was also released in America on Elektra as EKS-74068, and by Island in Germany as 87 609 ET.

In 1998, Renaissance was reissued by Mooncrest Records in the UK as Innocence. This reissue included six bonus tracks, but the packaging included no explanation of what they were. Besides "Island" (single version) and "The Sea" (see above), there were the following:
"Shining Where the Sun Has Been":  pre-Renaissance demo (1968) recorded by Keith Relf and Jim McCarty under the name "Together."
"Prayer for Light" and "Walking Away":  tracks recorded, post-Renaissance, by Relf and McCarty (written & sung by Jim) for the unreleased 1971 film Schizom.
"All the Fallen Angels":  Demo, 1976. Keith's final recorded performance. Also released on the album Enchanted Caress (1979), under the name Illusion.

On 29 November 2010, Esoteric Recordings released a remastered and expanded edition (including both sides of the band’s first single).

Notes and references
Notes

References

Renaissance (band) albums
1969 debut albums
Albums produced by Paul Samwell-Smith
Island Records albums
Elektra Records albums
Repertoire Records albums
Mooncrest Records albums
Esoteric Recordings albums
Symphonic rock albums